Thor Mikalsen (born 12 July 1973) is a retired Norwegian football midfielder.

He played second-tier football for Bodø/Glimt in 1989, helped win promotion and the 1993 Norwegian Football Cup Final, remaining in Bodø/Glimt throughout 2000. He played the 2001 season in Bryne and then returned north with two seasons in Fauske/Sprint. From 2006 to the summer of 2010 he was player-manager of Steigen.

References

1973 births
Living people
Sportspeople from Bodø
Norwegian footballers
FK Bodø/Glimt players
Bryne FK players
Norwegian First Division players
Eliteserien players
Association football midfielders
Norway youth international footballers
Norway under-21 international footballers